The AAA Northern Tag Team Championship (Campeonatos de Parejas del Norte AAA in Spanish) was a secondary tag team title contested for in the Mexican lucha libre promotion Lucha Libre AAA Worldwide (AAA). The title was contested for almost exclusively in the Monterrey, Nuevo León area, primarily in Arena Coliseo. The championship was generally not featured on AAA's television programming not even when reigning champions wrestled. Some of the championship histories is unclear, especially around the creation of the championship, it was originally not an AAA championship but a Northwestern region tag team title defended on the independent circuit but the origin remains unclear. Being a professional wrestling championship, it is not won legitimately: it is instead won via a predetermined ending to a wrestling match.

Status
The last known AAA Northern Tag Team Champions during its original tenure were Poder del Norte ("The Power of the North"; Tigre Cota and Tito Santana), who defeated Angel Dorada Jr. and Sky on March 7, 2010 to win the titles. This is the first championship reign for this particular combination of Poder del Norte, however Tito Santana and Rio Bravo previously held the titles for a long period of time from 2007 until 2009. The championship has not been defended since it was won in March 2010. in 2012, Tito Santana was turned into "Soul Rocker" and made a part of Los Infierno Rockers with Machine Rocker, Uru Rocker, Devil Rocker and Demon Rocker, retiring the title. The championship was revived in 2017; on October 16, 2017, La División del Norte ("The Northern Division "; Kuas Extrem and Snaiper) won a four-way tag team match to win the revived championships. The team has yet to defend the titles.

Title history

Footnotes

References

Lucha Libre AAA Worldwide championships
Tag team wrestling championships
Regional professional wrestling championships